Samir Bağırov is an Azerbaijani pop singer.

Life and career

1987-1991: Baku Autumn-88 
In November 1987, Bağırov became a laureate of "Baku Autumn - 88" (" republican competition. He sang two songs in the contest "Baku Autumn-88" which were "Don't Fly" and "I Believe" ("Не улетай" and "Inanıram"). In 1989, he entered the vocal show department of the educational institution Gnessin Music Academy in Moscow. There, he learned vocals, dancing, how to use scene managers, and how to dress on stage.

Yalta 1991 Contest: Moscow-Yalta-Transit 
In 1991, Bağırov became laureate of "Yalta - 91" international television competition. He sang Rashid Behbudov's "Sevgilim" and sang Whitney Houston's "All at Once (Whitney Houston song)". After the contest, Igor Krutoy composed "Small Cafe" and "Respond" for Bağırov. These songs were played on Channel One Russia and RTR. Following that, i.e. "Song of the year", " Hit Parade Ostankino", "Morning mail", "Wider circle". He was an honorary guest at the Yalta-92 contest. After participating in this program, Bağırov received an invitation from Alla Pugacheva to work in "Song Theatre". The theatre disbanded and Bağırov returned to Azerbaijani.

1993-1999: Wind Of 90s or "Game of Fate" Taleyin oyunu 
In 1993, SaBağırovmir conducted his first solo concert in the "Respublic" palace. He gave many concerts with his "girls" at Rashid Behbudov State Song Theatre, Green Theatre, Tofiq Bahramov Republican Stadium, Baku State Circus and Republican Palace. In 1995, he was honorary guest contest of Asian Daus (The Voice Of Asia). In 1996, second solo concert called "We love each other so much" was held in "Respublic" palace. After the second solo concert, Bağırov gave another concert titled "Samir Bağırov & his friends". In 1997, he enrolled in the contest "Musical challenge" which was shown on Space (TV channel) and won.

The song "Game Of Fate" (Taleyin oyunu) brought him popularity. The song was composed and written by Zaur Abdullayev.

2000-2001: Sevgilim XXI and Sevgilim 
Bağırov succeeded singing "Sevgilim" in the 1991. In 2000, he sang "Sevgilim" again, but this time in a different style. New cover of "My Lover" succeeded in giving bomb effect to Baku. In 2001, his "Sevgilim" music video was awarded as "The best" in the music video category. Finally, the audience saw the first solo album by Samir Bağırov called "Sevgilim XXI" and which consists of thirteen songs. 12 August 2001, for the first time in Sumgayit, in the DK chemists them. Uz. Hajibeyov hosted a charity concert of Azerbaijani pop star, nominee of the independent public national "Grand" "Best singer of the year" Samir Bağırov, who performed with the show program "Sevgilim-XXI". The show program included: the actor of the Russian drama theater Eldar Bagirbekov, the rising star - dancer Naila Dadasheva, who invariably accompanies the singer Akin and Zalina in all concerts and the show ballet Spider (head Andrei Babich).

Artistry

Influences 
Bağırov was influenced by musicians Alla Pugacheva, Muslim Magomayev (musician), Rashid Behbudov and Whitney Houston. Alla Pugacheva has always been Bağırov's favorite singer. Whitney Houston is one of his greatest inspirations. In an interview in the 90s, he once said, "I think Whitney Houston is phenomena of pop music."

Musical themes and genres

Bağırov explored a variety of music genres, including pop, jazz, soul, rhythm and blues, rock, disco, dance-pop, flamenco and New Age music. Beginning in the 90s he started to compose songs about love. In 1995 he commemorated the filming of the video of "Love Island" and which was composed by Bağırov. He received his first prize for this video in CIS video competition.

He composed a song named "Otpusti" with Elkhan Zeynalli in the memory of the friend Sima Bashirova who died in 1998. In 2000, he won from "Altun Nar" the "Best Multi-genres singer" award.

Awards 
He was a laureate of the contest "Baku-Autumn 88". In 1991, Bağırov's brings prize of contest "Yalta Transit-Moscow 1991". He received first prize for "Love Island" video in CIS video competition for song "Love Island" which was composed by Samir Bağırov. In 2001, his "Sevgilim" music video was awarded as "The best" in the music video category. Samir Bağırov is double laureate of "Grand" Independent Public National Prize, "Best of Best", the owner of two "Altun Nar" - Statuette Duet, in nomination "The best multi genres singer" (with Brilliant Dadashova).

Jury membership of contests 
In 2000 to 2001, Bağırov was invited to jury membership in "Baku Autumn 2000 and 2001" competition. Five years later, he was invited as a juror in the "Academy Music Show" contest where Brilliant Dadasova organized. Also in 2000, Bağırov got invited as a juror in Fashion Week's "Miss Azerbaijan".

Music videos 
In 1989, Bağırov took the role with Sevil Hajiyeva for the music video for Brilliant Dadashova's song "Bayatılar". For the first time in 1993, Bağırov with Sevil took clip the song "De, kim eşitsin?" directed by Nazim Zeynalov. After 2 years, Bağırov took a prize for clip of "Love Island" video in the Radio Mayak competition.

List of music videos 
 De, kim eşitsin? 
 Остров Любви (Love Island)
 Sevgilim XXI
 Yağışın Nəğməsi (Song of rain)
 Mənsiz (Without me)
 Милая (My Pretty)
 Axtarıram]]
 Deyirdim sənə
 Sənsizlik
 Sevmədin gülüm

Discography 
 Sevgilim XXI (2000)
 Sensizlik (2004)

Tours and Concerts

World tours 
 "Yalta 91" The Winners Concert
 "Song Of Year" (1991) in Russia
 Theatre of Russia (1992)
 Concert Tour with Manana Japaridze (2000 year)

Regional tours 
 Concert in Rebuclic Palace in 1993
 "Narkodunya" concert in 1993
 Show Ilgar Hayal in 1993
 Rock Concert with band "TAC"
 "We love each other so much" in 1996
 Concert with Manana Japaridze Palace Named Of Shahriyar (2003)

Televised concerts 
 The Winners of Baku Autumn 1988
 New Year Concert (1997), AzTV
 New Year Concert, ABA TV
 Musical challenge, Space TV
 Garden of Stars, Space TV
 Birthday Concert of Samir Bağırov "30 years old"
 Birthday Concert of Samir Bağırov (2003)
 Sabir Rustamkhanli music evening concert
 Vagif Gerayzade's concert tribute
 Muslim Magomayev 60th Birthday Tribute
 Rashid Behbudov 90th Birthday Tribute

References

Living people
21st-century Azerbaijani male singers
Musicians from Baku
20th-century Azerbaijani male singers
Year of birth missing (living people)
Place of birth missing (living people)